Ardnamurchan (: headland of the great seas) is a  peninsula in the ward management area of Lochaber, Highland, Scotland, noted for being very unspoiled and undisturbed. Its remoteness is accentuated by the main access route being a single track road for much of its length. The most westerly point of mainland Great Britain, Corrachadh Mòr, is in Ardnamurchan.

From 1930 to 1975 Ardnamurchan also gave its name to a landward district of Argyll, which covered a much wider area, including the districts of Morvern, Sunart and Ardgour.

Geography
Strictly speaking, Ardnamurchan covers only the peninsula beyond the villages of Salen (in the south) and Acharacle (in the north), but nowadays the term is also used more generally to include the neighbouring districts of Sunart, Ardgour, Morvern, and even Moidart (which was part of the former county of Inverness-shire, not Argyll).

Ardnamurchan Point, which has the  Ardnamurchan Lighthouse built on it, is commonly described as the most westerly point of the British mainland although Corrachadh Mòr, a kilometre to the south, is a few metres farther west.

Geology
The north western corner of Ardnamurchan consists of a lopolith (previously interpreted as a ring dyke) that has been exposed at the surface. Evidence for such a structure can be identified from the phenocrysts in the rock exposures around the area of interest which show plagioclase crystals aligned towards the centre of the complex, an alignment caused by magmatic flow within a lopolith. Relatively small areas of lava that were ejected onto the surface are found in some parts of the peninsula, close to the inner edges of the area of interest. The sub-concentric rings of the geologic structure can easily be seen in satellite photographs and on topographic maps, though they are less obvious on the ground. At least seven other similar complexes of the same tectonic episode exist along the west coast of Britain, and these are popular sites for many university geological training courses.

History
Adomnan of Iona records St Columba visiting the peninsula in the 6th century, and gives the impression that it was settled by Irish Gaels at that time. He records three instances of signs performed by Columba on the peninsula.

Adomnan records in one instance that Columba prophesied to his companions the death of Kings Báetán mac Muirchertaig and Eochaid mac Domnaill before news arrived the same day at a place called 'paradise bay' to tell them the news. In the second instance, which is said to have occurred in an unnamed rocky spot in the interior, the parents of a boy brought their child to Columba to be baptized but no water could be found, and Columba prayed to God and water miraculously came out of a nearby rock and he prophesied that the child would live a sinful life and later be a saint.

In the third instance, which took place at a spot Adomnan called 'Sharp bay', there was a wicked man named Ioan mac Conaill maic Domnaill who was related to the Cenél nGabraín, and this man attacked Columba's friend and plundered his goods. Columba met this wicked man and called on him to repent, but he didn't listen and instead boarded his boat with the stolen goods. Columba then followed the boat, wading into the water up to his knees and prayed to God. He then prophesied to his companions that this man and his boat were going to meet with disaster on the sea, and according to Adomnan, the boat was sunk before reaching land with Ioan drowning at sea along with his stolen goods.
 
It may also be the 'Muirbole Paradisi' mentioned by Adomnán. Although its stone foundations still remain, the village of Bourblaige no longer exists, as it was destroyed in the Highland Clearances in the early 19th century.

According to early twentieth-century tradition in Ardnamurchan, two battles were fought in the bays between Gortenfern and Sgeir a' Chaolais. Archaeological finds in the vicinity of Cul na Croise—a bay between Sgeir a Chaolais and Sgeir nam Meann—consist of spears, daggers, arrow-heads, and a coin dating to the reign of Edward I, King of England. These artefacts could indicate that Cul na Croise was the site of conflict fought in the context of the strife between Edward I's representative, Alasdair Óg Mac Domhnaill, and the Clann Ruaidhrí brothers, Lachlann Mac Ruaidhrí and Ruaidhrí Mac Ruaidhrí. According to tradition, one of the battles fought in the area concerned a certain "Red Rover", and another fought nearby concerned an Irishman named "Duing" or "Dewing". Relics of a Viking ship burial in Cul na Croise have been given to the West Highland Museum at Fort William.

In 2011, a Viking ship burial, probably from the 10th century, was unearthed at Port an Eilean Mhòir on Ardnamurchan. Grave goods buried alongside a Viking warrior found in the boat suggest he was a high-ranking warrior. The Ardnamurchan Viking was found buried with an axe, a sword with a decorated hilt, a spear, a shield boss and a bronze ring pin. Other finds in the  grave in Ardnamurchan included a knife, what could be the tip of a bronze drinking horn, a whetstone from Norway, a ring pin from Ireland and Viking Age pottery.

Settlements

The population of the whole peninsula is around 2000. Historically part of the former county of Argyll, it is now part of the Lochaber ward management area of the Highland local authority.

Villages in Ardnamurchan: 
 Acharacle 
 Achnaha
 Glenborrodale
 Kilchoan
 Kilmory
 Laga
 Ockle
 Portuairk
 Salen
 Sanna

Scottish Gaelic
Ardnamurchan has one of the highest concentrations of Scottish Gaelic speakers on the mainland, with 19.3% of the local population able to speak the language. The peninsula is also home to an annual Mòd, an eisteddfod-like festival and series of contests celebrating the Gaelic language, its culture, music, and literature.

Ardnamurchan has also been the home to a number of important figures in Scottish Gaelic literature.

Prior to his involvement in the Jacobite rising of 1745, the legendary Gaelic poet Alasdair mac Mhaighstir Alasdair worked a schoolmaster for the Society for Promoting Christian Knowledge in Kilchoan, where his father had previously served as Rector for the Jacobite and High Church Non-Juring Anglican Communion.

The poem influenced Somhairle MacGill-Eain, who wrote a poem to its author.

Economy
Ardnamurchan distillery is a Scotch whisky distillery located on the peninsula.

Culture

The peninsula has its own shinty team, Ardnamurchan Camanachd.

Fauna and scenery
Rare species such as the wildcat, pine marten, golden eagle and white-tailed eagle can be seen in Ardnamurchan.

Ardnamurchan is wild and unspoiled. Ardnamurchan Point, adjacent to the most westerly point on the British mainland, has a lighthouse and a view from a sheer rock face of the open Atlantic Ocean. The northern part of Ardnamurchan forms part of the Morar, Moidart and Ardnamurchan National Scenic Area, one of 40 such areas in Scotland, which are defined so as to identify areas of exceptional scenery and to ensure their protection by restricting certain forms of development.

Famous people
The geologist Donald Duff FRSE (1927–98) bought a house there after surveying the area in the 1950s.
The button box accordion player, Fergie MacDonald, is from the area.
The preacher J. Douglas MacMillan came from Ardnamurchan.
The cameraman, CBeebies presenter and Strictly contestant Hamza Yassin has lived in the area for 12 years

See also
List of listed buildings in Ardnamurchan

Notes and references

External links
Ardnamurchan Tourist Association
All about Ardnamurchan

 
National scenic areas of Scotland
Sites of Special Scientific Interest in South Lochaber
Volcanoes of Scotland
Eocene volcanoes
Extinct volcanoes
Complex volcanoes
Highland Estates